WVBF (1530 AM) is a radio station broadcasting a news/talk format. Licensed to Middleborough Center, Massachusetts, United States, the station serves the Middleborough–Taunton area. The station is currently owned by Massachusetts state senator Marc R. Pacheco through his MRP Communications and Consulting, LLC. WVBF carries the Massachusetts Reading Network when not airing local programming. USA Radio News plays at the top of the hour during locally produced programs.

History
The station went on the air as WCEG on March 31, 1992.  Original owner Steven J. Callahan sold the station to Metro South Broadcasting, owner of WMSX in Brockton, on January 7, 1993. The new owners dropped WCEG's music programming in favor of a simulcast of WMSX; separate programming was subsequently introduced in Portuguese. However, the station had been silent for several years by 1996, when Callahan reached a deal to repurchase the station. Soon after reassuming control on January 5, 1997, Callahan brought WCEG back on the air with radio reading service programming; the call letters were changed to WVBF on March 21, 1997. The WVBF call sign had previously been used by 105.7 FM in Framingham from 1971 until 1993, while broadcasting top 40 and adult contemporary formats; that station is now WROR-FM.

From the station's inception, WCEG/WVBF only broadcast during daytime hours with 1,000 watts; however, 2-watt nighttime service was inaugurated in 2002. In 2006, the station's daytime power was increased to 2,200 watts. On August 7, 2007, WVBF began to air several local talk shows from studios in Taunton; these shows moved from WPEP (1570 AM), which was in the process of closing down to accommodate a power increase at WNSH in Beverly. The radio reading service programming continues when talk programming does not air.

Translator
WVBF is relayed on translator station W259DD, which transmits on 99.7 MHz. It received its license to cover on April 10, 2019.

References

External links

Middleborough, Massachusetts
VBF
Mass media in Plymouth County, Massachusetts
News and talk radio stations in the United States
Radio reading services of the United States
Radio stations established in 1992
1992 establishments in Massachusetts